Forrest Place is a pedestrianised square located within the CBD of Perth, Western Australia. The street was created in 1923, and has a history of being a focal point for significant political meetings and demonstrations.

Description
Forrest Place connects Perth Railway Station on Wellington Street with the Murray Street Mall, outside the Carillon City shopping centre. The eastern side of the street is lined by shops from the Forrest Chase shopping complex, while the historic General Post Office and Commonwealth Bank buildings are located to the west.

Forrest Place is used in many ways throughout the year, including cultural displays, children's activities and parades, and contains the City of Perth visitors centre.

Nearby transport facilities include Perth railway station and Perth Busport, and Perth Central Area Transit (CAT) buses run along Wellington Street,

History

Named after Sir John Forrest, the first Premier of Western Australia, Forrest Place was for most of its history a roadway between the Perth railway station and Murray Street.

It was originally a plot of land issued to Patrick Farmer in 1840. Prior to Forrest Place's construction, an arcade between Wellington and Murray Streets existed on the site known as Central Arcade. It was considered an "unhealthy" establishment, which led to its demolition. The construction of Forrest Place deemed to have "changed the face of Perth".

Streetscape
Prior to the building of the Forrest Chase complex (containing Myer and numerous other retail stores), the central building on the eastern side of Forrest Place was the Padbury Buildings (built in 1925 and demolished in 1986–1987). While the buildings on the east side have changed a number of times in the street's 82-year history, the General Post Office (completed in 1923) and the Commonwealth Bank building (completed 1933), both designed by John Smith Murdoch in the Interwar Beaux-Arts style and faced with Donnybrook stone, have endured significant change around them.

Parades, meetings and rallying place
In the 1940s returned soldiers marched through Forrest Place.
It was a meeting place and focal point for political meetings in the 1950s through to the 1980s; considerable use was made of the steps of the Post Office being above the roadway level.

An attempt to defuse the political nature of the space and ban meetings in Forrest Place was carried out by Charles Court, on 18 November 1975, when his government used Section 54B of the Western Australia Police Act to ban meetings. Considerable numbers of demonstrations resulted from this ban, which was later repealed by the Public Meetings and Processions Act of 1984.

In 2013, the history of protests held at Forest Place, and the responses by authorities, was the subject of a presentation by Murdoch University Adjunct Associate Professor Lenore Layman. These events are considered by Layman to be part of an "alternative history of Perth" that isn't so sedated.
In 2017, in a chapter in the book Radical Perth, Militant Fremantle Layman develops an argument that Forrest Place was a location of conflict over the usage of the space as a place for freedom of speech, association and peaceful assembly.

With the 2021 AFL Grand Final being held at Perth Stadium because of a COVID-19 lockdown in Melbourne, in lieu of the traditional AFL Grand Final parade a "people's parade" was held at Forrest Place allowing fans to celebrate the game (but without the clubs in attendance) on 24 September 2021, the day before the final. The premiership cup presentation also took place at Forrest Place the day after the final following the Melbourne Football Club's victory over the Western Bulldogs, with the winning team in attendance.

Pedestrian mall

Forrest Place became a large paved area with the closing of the roadway in the late 1986. It still links Wellington Street and Perth railway station with the Murray Street Mall, with the placement of the "Grow Your Own" public artwork limiting vehicular access to the north.

See also

 List of lanes and arcades in Perth, Western Australia

References

Further reading
 Conole, Peter.(2002) Protect & serve : a history of policing in Western Australia Scarborough, W.A. : Western Australian Police Historical Society.  – see specially pp. 343–348 regarding the problems of 54B for the police service.
 Gregory, Jenny. (2003) City of light: a history of Perth since the 1950s Perth, W.A.: City of Perth  – see specially pp. 124–130 concerning the political history of the space.

Original title and later map of site
 Mason, John. Title of Perth town lot V 17, 1840 Issued in his name, 3 November 1840. (Mason, John—Archives – Battye Library)
 Australia. Dept. of the Interior.(1911) Perth new G.P.O. site: Plan of existing buildings. Plan Nos. D663 and D664.(Signed by Hillton Beasley, Chief Architect). (Australian Archives)

External links

Photographs of Forrest Place, State Library of Western Australia
Photographs of the Padbury Buildings, State Library of Western Australia

 
Streets in Perth central business district, Western Australia